The Roman Catholic Diocese of Izcalli is based in the city of Cuautitlán Izcalli, State of Mexico, Mexico.  It is a suffragan see to the Archdiocese of Tlalnepantla.

History
On 9 June 2014 Pope Francis established the diocese from territory taken from the Diocese of Cuautitlán.

Ordinaries
Francisco González Ramos (2014-)

References

Izcalli
Christian organizations established in 2014
Izcalli
Izcalli
2014 establishments in Mexico